Vlašić is a Serbo-Croatian toponym and surname. It is sometimes rendered as Wlassics in Hungarian. It may refer to:

Toponyms 
 Vlašić (Bosnia and Herzegovina), a mountain in Bosnia and Herzegovina
 Vlašić (Serbia), a mountain in Serbia

People 
 Blanka Vlašić, Croatian athlete
 Franjo Vlašić, Croatian ban
 Frank Vlašić, founder of Vlasic Pickles
 Joško Vlašić, Croatian athletics coach
 Marc-Édouard Vlasic, Canadian ice hockey player
 Mark Vlasic, American football player
 Nikola Vlašić, Croatian footballer
 Nikolai Vlasik, Soviet general
 Perica Vlašić, Croatian rower
 Tomislav Vlašić, Croatian ex-priest
 Gyula Wlassics (1852–1937), Hungarian politician
 Tibor Wlassics, Hungarian scholar

Other uses 
 Vlašić cheese, a brined mostly low-fat white cheese made from sheep-milk
 Vlasic Pickles, a company specializing in pickled products

Croatian surnames